Keisan Game Sansū Series (Calculation Game: Arithmetic series) is a video game series focusing on elementary arithmetic calculation of basic math, featuring addition, subtraction, multiplication, division, decimals, and fractions. The series is only available in Japanese.

Sansū 1-nen: Keisan Game
 is the first in a series of arithmetic learning video games for the Nintendo Family Computer. It was released April 25, 1986.

As a video game primarily meant for educational purposes, there is very little variety between the four modes of the game. Half of the modes are for addition, while the other half are for subtraction. These modes each contain short mini-games where the player must solve the displayed math problems. Even though this game is educational, players can only incorrectly answer five times before a game over.

This methodology of learning replicated the "sink or swim" philosophy of teaching and would be used in the later games.

Sansū 2-nen: Keisan Game
 is the second in a series of arithmetic learning video games for the Nintendo Family Computer.

Intended to be an educational video game, there is little variety to this video game. Even though this game is educational, players can only incorrectly guess five times before "dying" and being given a game over message. This methodology of learning replicated the "sink or swim" philosophy of teaching.

Math problems included with this game allow players to play on a golf course (but with slightly different rules than a regular game of golf), work in a robot factory, and fill the multiplication table full of basic multiplication facts.

Sansū 3-nen: Keisan Game
 is the third in a series of arithmetic learning video games for the Nintendo Family Computer.

No addition or subtraction facts are taught in this game. Primarily meant for educational purposes, there is little variety.

Four modes are utilized, two for multiplication and two for division. These game modes contain short minigames where solving the displayed math problems correctly results in positive feedback. The division rounds allow players to control a submarine, while the multiplication rounds allow the players to become space cadets and car drivers. Only five incorrect answers and being hit by "enemy" are accepted before the game prematurely ends. Dividing by zero appears to be expected by the player in the game, simply resulting in an answer of zero.

Sansū 4-nen: Keisan Game
 is a Family Computer educational video game that was released on October 30, 1986.

This video game is an educational game teaching four basic principles: division, adding/subtracting decimals, adding/subtracting fractions and multiplying/dividing decimals. Each minigame has two difficulty levels and allows for two players to take turns playing the minigames.

In the "Division" and "Decimal Addition & Subtraction" challenges, players have to control a man as he tries to destroy monsters inside a dungeon with a sword. An unbeatable ghost runs outside the building; it cannot be defeated with the sword and will instantly defeat the character if touched. Touching the wrong number answer will instantly cost a life. Climbing to the top of the building results in more math questions being asked. The other challenges result in having to control a race car as it navigates through a complex labyrinth. Players must find the exit tile while avoiding rival drivers in order to access the next math question.

Reference:Sansu 4-nen: Keisan Game

Sansū 5+6 Toshi: Keisan Game

Reference:Sansu 5・6-nen: Keisan Game

External links
 Keisan Game (series) at MobyGames
 Keisan Game at GameFAQs
 Keisan Game at Superfamicom.org

References 

1986 introductions
1986 video games
Children's educational video games
Mathematical education video games
Japan-exclusive video games
Nintendo Entertainment System-only games
Nintendo Entertainment System games
Tokyo Shoseki games
Video game franchises